The Red Crescent Society of the United Arab Emirates is the United Arab Emirates (UAE) affiliate of the International Federation of Red Cross and Red Crescent Societies. The authority was founded in Abu Dhabi in 1983 with support of the late Sheikh Zayed bin Sultan Al Nahyan. Its main objectives are to carry out Red Cross operations on a systematic basis throughout the UAE.

References

External links
 Official website: Red Crescent Society of the United Arab Emirates

United Arab Emirates
Charities based in the United Arab Emirates
Medical and health organisations based in the United Arab Emirates
Organizations established in 1983
1983 establishments in the United Arab Emirates